Monmouth Boroughs (also known as the Monmouth District of Boroughs) was a parliamentary constituency consisting of several towns in Monmouthshire. It returned one Member of Parliament (MP) to the House of Commons of the Parliaments of England, Great Britain, and finally the United Kingdom; until 1832 the constituency was known simply as Monmouth, though it included other "contributory boroughs".

History and boundaries
The area was first enfranchised as the single-member borough of Monmouth or Monmouth Town in the reign of Henry VIII, at the same time as the counties and boroughs of Wales. On official, national-level paper cast as being in England its electoral arrangements from the outset resembled those of the Welsh boroughs rather than those in the rest of England - its single member and its other "contributory boroughs" in the same county, which were required to contribute to the members' expenses and which had the right to send voters to take part in the election at the county town.  These were initially six or perhaps seven in number: Caerleon, Newport, Trellech, Usk, Chepstow, Abergavenny and possibly Grosmont; but by the late 17th century all of the electors were freemen of Monmouth, Usk and Newport.

The franchise was settled by a judgment in a disputed election in 1680, when Monmouth attempted to return a member to parliament without the involvement of the other boroughs, and the Court declared the right to vote to rest in the resident freemen of Monmouth, Newport and Usk. The number of electors fell away sharply during the 18th century - from 2,000 in 1715 to about 800 in the 1754-1790 period; by the time of the Great Reform Act in 1832 qualified voters numbered: 123 in Newport, 83 in Monmouth and 74 in Usk. In Tudor times the seat was under the influence of the Duchy of Lancaster and around the start of the 18th century it was a pocket borough of the Morgan family of Tredegar, who were influential in the Newport area; but soon afterwards the Dukes of Beaufort (a Scudamore family branch) gained control. After the Duke's candidate had won the election of 1715 decisively, this patronage was so clear contests ceased until 1820 – their candidates (many of them members of the family) were returned unopposed.

At the time of the Great Reform Act (or First Reform Act), 1832, Monmouth and Newport each had around 5,000 residents and Usk just over 1,000. This was great for most seats of its type – even dual-member boroughs were mostly were kept if they had or could be simply drawn to exceed 4,000 residents. Nevertheless, all three parts of this seat were expanding by taking into the new high-rent-paying and/or landed outlook (franchise) a broad view of each town; such area took in 13,101 people and its electorate (under the "reformed" franchise) was 899. Henceforth it was generally referred to as the Monmouth Boroughs.

From 1832 until 1906 results tended on 'marginal' rather than 'safe', alternating between Conservatives and Whigs/Liberals.  Crawshay Bailey (Con.) was returned unopposed four times after he was first elected. The seat moved steadily towards the Liberals, however, as the franchise became more inclusive and Newport grew in size; by the turn of the century 90% of the electorate was there, and it was a mass-labour working class and mainly industrial town unlike Monmouth and Usk. The Conservatives won in their landslide year of 1900 and held the seat in the by-election when that election was voided for various irregularities, but were probably helped by the association of the Liberal candidate with the campaign to extend the Welsh Sunday Closing Act to Monmouthshire. After, it was identifiably "safely" Liberal, and at the time of the 1911 census had a population of 77,902.

The seat was abolished by the Representation of the People Act 1918: Newport became a parliamentary borough; Monmouth and Usk, mainstays of "Monmouth" county constituency.

Boundary reforms
Redefined limits of the three contributory boroughs were set in 1832 and 1885.

Members of Parliament

1545-1640

1640-1918

Election results

Elections in the 1830s

 On petition, Hall was unseated and Somerset was declared elected.

Elections in the 1840s

Elections in the 1850s

Blewitt resigned by accepting the office of Steward of the Manor of Hempholme, causing a by-election.

Elections in the 1860s

Elections in the 1870s

Elections in the 1880s

Elections in the 1890s

Elections in the 1900s

Elections in the 1910s 

General Election 1914–15:

Another General Election was required to take place before the end of 1915. The political parties had been making preparations for an election to take place and by the July 1914, the following candidates had been selected; 
Liberal: Lewis Haslam
Unionist:

Notes and references 
Notes

References

Bibliography
 S T Bindoff, The History of Parliament: The House of Commons 1509-1558 (Secker & Warburg, 1982)
 D Brunton & D H Pennington, Members of the Long Parliament (London: George Allen & Unwin, 1954)
 The Constitutional Year Book for 1913 (London: National Union of Conservative and Unionist Associations, 1913)
F W S Craig, British Parliamentary Election Results 1832-1885 (2nd edition, Aldershot: Parliamentary Research Services, 1989)
 P W Hasler, The History of Parliament: The House of Commons 1558-1603 (London: HMSO, 1981)
 Lewis Namier & John Brooke, The History of Parliament: The House of Commons 1754-1790 (London: HMSO, 1964)
 J. E. Neale, The Elizabethan House of Commons (London: Jonathan Cape, 1949)
 T. H. B. Oldfield, The Representative History of Great Britain and Ireland (London: Baldwin, Cradock & Joy, 1816)
 Henry Pelling, Social Geography of British Elections 1885-1910 (London: Macmillan, 1967)
 J Holladay Philbin, Parliamentary Representation 1832 - England and Wales (New Haven: Yale University Press, 1965)
 Romney Sedgwick, The History of Parliament: The House of Commons 1715-1754, (London: HMSO, 1970)
 Robert Walcott, English Politics in the Early Eighteenth Century (Oxford: Oxford University Press, 1956)
 Parliamentary Boundaries Act, 1832 (2 & 3 Will. 4 c.64), Schedule O
 Redistribution of Seats Act, 1885 (48 & 49 Vict c.23), Ninth Schedule
 W R Williams The Parliamentary History of the Principality of Wales
 Cobbett's Parliamentary history of England, from the Norman Conquest in 1066 to the year 1803 (London: Thomas Hansard, 1808) 
 

History of Monmouthshire
Historic parliamentary constituencies in South Wales
Constituencies of the Parliament of the United Kingdom disestablished in 1918
Constituencies of the Parliament of the United Kingdom established in 1545
Politics of Monmouthshire